Parascyllium is a genus of carpetsharks in the family Parascylliidae.  Species in this genus are distributed in waters around Australia.

Species
 Parascyllium collare E. P. Ramsay & Ogilby, 1888 (collared carpetshark)
 Parascyllium elongatum Last & Stevens, 2008 (elongate carpetshark)
 Parascyllium ferrugineum McCulloch, 1911 (rusty carpetshark)
 Parascyllium sparsimaculatum T. Goto & Last, 2002 (ginger carpetshark)
 Parascyllium variolatum A. H. A. Duméril, 1853 (necklace carpetshark)

References

 
Parascylliidae
Shark genera
Taxa named by Theodore Gill